NA-251 Killa Saifullah-cum-Zhob-cum-Sherani is a constituency for the National Assembly of Pakistan.

Assembly Segments

Members of Parliament

Since 2018: NA-257 Killa Saifullah-cum-Zhob-cum-Sherani

Election 2002 

General elections were held on 10 Oct 2002. Maulvi Muhammad Khan Sherani of Muttahida Majlis-e-Amal won by 20,381 votes.

Election 2008 

General elections were held on 18 Feb 2008. Maulvi Asmatullah an Independent candidate won by 24,204 votes.

Election 2013 

General elections were held on 11 May 2013. Moulana Mohammad Khan Sherani of JUI-F won by 30,870 votes and became the member of National Assembly.

Election 2018 

General elections were held on 25 July 2018.

†JUI-F contested as part of MMA

See also
NA-250 Karachi Central-IV
NA-252 Loralai-cum-Musakhel-cum-Duki-cum-Barkhan

References

External links 
Election result's official website

NA-264